Decommissioning is a general term for a formal process to remove something from an active status, and may refer to:

Infrastructure
 Decommissioned offshore
 Decommissioned highway
 Greenfield status of former industrial sites
 Nuclear decommissioning

Military
 Decommissioning in Northern Ireland of paramilitary weapons
 Decommissioning pennant, where a navy ship wears an extremely long commissioning pennant at the end of its commission overseas
 Demobilization of soldiers
 Disarmament
 Ship-Submarine Recycling Program for U.S. nuclear vessels

Other
 Ship decommissioning

See also
 Commission (disambiguation)
 End-of-life (product)
 Planned obsolescence